Edgebrook is a commuter railroad station on Metra's Milwaukee District North Line in the Edgebrook neighborhood of the Forest Glen section of Chicago, Illinois. In Metra's zone-based fare system, Edgebrook is in zone C. As of 2018, Edgebrook is the 74th busiest of Metra's 236 non-downtown stations, with an average of 701 weekday boardings. This is the last station outbound in Chicago city limits.

As of December 12, 2022, Edgebrook is served by 41 trains (20 inbound, 21 outbound) on weekdays, by all 20 trains (10 in each direction) on Saturdays, and by all 18 trains (nine in each direction) on Sundays and holidays.

Bus connections
CTA
  84 Peterson  
  85A North Central 

Pace
  225 Central/Howard  
  226 Oakton Street

References

External links

Station from Devon Avenue from Google Maps Street View

Metra stations in Chicago
Former Chicago, Milwaukee, St. Paul and Pacific Railroad stations